Snotty Nose Rez Kids are a First Nations hip hop duo composed of Haisla rappers Darren "Young D" Metz and Quinton "Yung Trybez" Nyce. They are originally from Kitamaat Village, British Columbia, and currently based in Vancouver. Their 2017 album The Average Savage was shortlisted for the 2018 Polaris Music Prize, and for the Juno Award for Indigenous Music Album of the Year at the Juno Awards of 2019. In 2018, the duo received nominations for Best Hip Hop Album at the Indigenous Music Awards, and for Indigenous Artist of the Year at the Western Canadian Music Awards. Their third album TRAPLINE was released on May 10, 2019 and was later shortlisted for the 2019 Polaris Music Prize.

Career 
Metz and Nyce first connected as writers during high school - Metz wrote poetry and Nyce was a storyteller - realizing they both had a love of hip-hop. The two started recording together under the name Minay Music for a project Metz was assigned during his audio engineering program at Harbourside Institute of Technology.

The duo released their self-titled debut album in January 2017, and followed up with The Average Savage in September. Their single "Skoden" was playlisted on CBC Music's Reclaimed, and was named one of the year's 100 best songs by the network. The song received renewed attention in 2018 when a graffiti artist spraypainted "Skoden" on the water tower in downtown Sudbury. The word "Skoden" is a phrase that means "let's go then", and has been a long standing popular phrase in Indigenous circles.

In May 2018, they released the new single "The Warriors", a protest song opposing the Trans Mountain Pipeline, and signed to Jarrett Martineau's RPM Records. After a brief stint with RPM, Snotty Nose Rez Kids decided to part ways and release their next album independently. Their third album, TRAPLINE, was released on May 10, 2019. In June 2019, TRAPLINE was shortlisted for the 2019 Polaris Music Prize. Exclaim! named the album the 7th best hip hop album of the year.

In 2020, the duo announced that they would releasing the EP Born Deadly on April 3. The EP was preceded by two singles: "Real Deadly" and "Cops with Guns Are the Worst!!!".

Discography

Albums 

 Snotty Nose Rez Kids (2017)
 The Average Savage (2017)
TRAPLINE (2019)
 Life After (2021)
 I’M GOOD, HBU? (2022)

EPs 

 Born Deadly (2020)

Singles 

 "The Warriors" (2018)
 "Homeland" ft. Mob Bounce (2018)
"Creator Made an Animal" ft. Boslen (2019)
"I Can't Remember My Name" ft. Shanks Sioux (2019)
"Real Deadly" (2020)
"Cops with Guns Are the Worst!!!"

Compilation albums 

 Tiny House Warriors (2018)

References

Canadian hip hop groups
First Nations musical groups
Musical groups from Vancouver
Musical groups established in 2016
Canadian musical duos
Hip hop duos
2016 establishments in British Columbia